Pickton is an unincorporated community in Hopkins County, Texas, United States. Pickton has a post office with the ZIP code 75471.

Public education in the community of Pickton is provided by the Como-Pickton Consolidated Independent School District

References

Unincorporated communities in Hopkins County, Texas
Unincorporated communities in Texas